The 1997 Colorado State Rams football team represented Colorado State University in the 1997 NCAA Division I-A football season The Rams were led by fifth-year head coach Sonny Lubick and played their home games at Hughes Stadium in Fort Collins, Colorado. Colorado State competed as a member of the Western Athletic Conference in the Pacific Division. They won that division with a 7–1 conference record, earning them a spot in the 1997 WAC Championship Game, where they defeated New Mexico to earn their third WAC title in four years. They were invited to the 1997 Holiday Bowl, where they defeated Missouri, and were ranked 17th in the final AP Poll of the season, the second ranked finish in school history and first since 1994.

Schedule

Roster

References

Colorado State
Colorado State Rams football seasons
Western Athletic Conference football champion seasons
Holiday Bowl champion seasons
Colorado State Rams football